Palakkad Gap or Palghat Gap  is a low mountain pass in the Western Ghats between Coimbatore in Tamil Nadu and Palakkad in Kerala. The pass is located between the Nilgiri Hills to the north and Anaimalai Hills to the south.

Origin and History

There are various theories about the origin of Palakkad gap. One among them is that it is caused by the landslide due to rivers flowing in opposite directions. The Bharathappuzha river (River Ponnani) originates in the Palakkad Gap from rivulets and tributaries feeding from steep escarpment slopes along the flanks of the Ghats. Another theory suggests that the gap may be created by an asteroid strike around 800 million to 550 million years ago.

Palakkad gap has played a major role in enabling human migration into Kerala from parts of Tamil Nadu. From 300 B.C. to 13th century, it also helped the Cheras rule the entire Kerala and the Kongu Nadu as one geographical unit from Karur in Western Tamil Nadu. Tamil Brahmins migrated to Palakkad from Central Tamil Nadu via the Palakkad gap from the 15th century to 18th century.

Effect on weather

The gap affects the weather patterns in Southern India as it allows the moisture-laden Southwest monsoon winds into western Tamil Nadu, moderating summer temperatures and generating greater rainfall in the region relative to the rest of lowland Tamil Nadu. It affects rainfall activity in parts of tamilnadu likely Coimbatore, palladam, kangeyam, dharapuram, udumalai. It also allows the hot winds coming from Tamil Nadu which warm the eastern part of Kerala compared to the rest of the state and the tropical cyclone winds from Bay of Bengal bearing rain during the summer.

Transport and trade
The gap is the lowest pass through the Western Ghats in the region. It is an important mountain pass in the Western Ghats that runs along the entire eastern edge of Kerala isolating it from the neighboring Tamil Nadu. It acts as an important transport corridor between the two States by linking Palakkad District of Kerala with Coimbatore District of Tamil Nadu and has served as a vital trade route between the east and west coasts of peninsular India since ancient times.

Both the National Highway 544 and the Coimbatore - Shoranur railway line , Palakkad - Pollachi Railway line joining Kerala to Tamil Nadu pass through the gap. The gap also helps for VHF line of sight communications between the states of Kerala and Tamil Nadu.

Wind Energy
The Palakkad Gap funnels the winds blowing from the west on to Palakkad District in Kerala , Coimbatore and Tirupur districts in Tamil Nadu making the region one of the major wind power generation areas. The average annual wind speed is 18–22 km/hr. Large windmill farms can be seen in and around Kanjikode, Chittur, Muthalamada, Kollengode, Pollachi, Kinathukadavu, Udumalaipettai, Dharapuram and Madathukulam.

See also
 Aryankavu mountain pass. 
 Aralvaimozhi
 Palghat

Gallery

References

External links

View of Palghat Gap from the Nelliampathy Mountain ranges

Mountain passes of the Western Ghats
Geography of Palakkad district
Tourist attractions in Palakkad district
Mountain passes of Kerala
Transport in Palakkad district